The SMI MID (SMIM) is a stock index which lists Switzerland's mid-cap companies. The index is calculated by SIX Swiss Exchange.

It includes the 30 Prime Standard shares from sectors that rank immediately below the companies included in the Swiss Market Index. The company size is based on terms of order book volume and market capitalization.

The SMI MID was introduced on 15 November 2004, computed back to 3 January 1996 with a baseline value of 1000 points as of 31 December 1999. Its composition is examined once a year. Calculation takes place in real-time: as soon as a new transaction occurs in a security contained in the SMI MID, an updated index level is calculated and displayed.

In 2020, the SMI MID, along with other SIX indices, was endorsed under the EU Benchmarks Regulation and is registered with the European Securities and Markets Authority, which means that it can be used as an underlying for financial products sold in the EU.

Constituents

September 20th, 2021 
The following 30 stocks make up the SMI MID index as of September 20, 2021. All components are mid-caps, except Sonova, which is a large cap.

Recent adjustments

In the week beginning on Monday, 19th September 2022, SGS (formerly in the SMI), Belimo and the Roche bearer shares will enter SMIM. They will replace Sonova (hearing aids), Cembra (credit cards and consumer credits) and BB Biotech (biotechnology investment company).

On March 31, 2022 the biochemical company Bachem was added to the index, replacing  Vifor Pharma , because after sell of Vifor Pharma to the Australian CSL the free float dropped to 1.6% which is below the minimum of 20% required by SIX for index members.

On September 18, 2020, four components were replaced.

On October 16, 2020, Tecan was added to the index after the takeover of Sunrise Communications Group AG.

See also
 Swiss Market Index

References

External links

Swiss stock market indices